was a town located in Ōno District, Ōita Prefecture, Japan.

As of 2003, the town had an estimated population of 9,309 and the density of 66.88 persons per km2. The total area was 139.19 km2.

On January 1, 2005, Notsu was merged into the expanded city of Usuki.

Dissolved municipalities of Ōita Prefecture